Miguashaiidae is an extinct family of prehistoric coelacanth fishes which lived during the Devonian period.

See also
 List of prehistoric bony fish

References 

Prehistoric lobe-finned fish families
Devonian bony fish
Devonian first appearances
Devonian extinctions